In heterotic string theory, the Strominger's equations are the set of equations that are necessary and sufficient conditions for spacetime supersymmetry. It is derived by requiring the 4-dimensional spacetime to be maximally symmetric, and adding a warp factor on the internal 6-dimensional manifold.

Consider a metric  on the real 6-dimensional internal manifold Y and a Hermitian metric h on a vector bundle V. The equations are:

 The 4-dimensional spacetime is Minkowski, i.e., .
 The internal manifold Y must be complex, i.e., the Nijenhuis tensor must vanish .
 The Hermitian form  on the complex threefold Y, and the Hermitian metric h on a vector bundle V must satisfy,
 
Li and Yau showed that the second condition is equivalent to  being conformally balanced, i.e., .
 The Yang–Mills field strength must satisfy,
 
 

These equations imply the usual field equations, and thus are the only equations to be solved.

However, there are topological obstructions in obtaining the solutions to the equations;

 The second Chern class of the manifold, and the second Chern class of the gauge field must be equal, i.e., 

Once the solutions for the Strominger's equations are obtained, the warp factor , dilaton  and the background flux H, are determined by
 ,
 ,

References

 Cardoso, Curio, Dall'Agata, Lust, Manousselis, and Zoupanos, Non-Kähler String Backgrounds and their Five Torsion Classes, hep-th/0211118

String theory